Dąbrowa  is a village in the administrative district of Gmina Korytnica, within Węgrów County, Masovian Voivodeship, in east-central Poland.

The village has a population of 98.

In the years 1975-1998, the town belonged administratively to the Siedlce Voivodeship.

References

Villages in Węgrów County